Björn Thurau (born 23 July 1988) is a German former professional road racing cyclist, who competed professionally between 2007 and 2019. He is the son of former cyclist Dietrich Thurau.

After retiring, Thurau was a presenter for Global Cycling Network's German-language YouTube channel. He left in February 2021.

In September 2021 he was banned from cycling for doping offences, and his results dating back to December 2010 were stripped.

Major results

2006
1st Overall Grand Prix Rüebliland
2009
4th Rund um die Nürnberger Altstadt
7th Overall Szlakiem Grodów Piastowskich
2011
9th Overall Paris–Corrèze
10th Overall Azerbaijan International Cycling Tour
2012
4th Overall Mi-Août Bretonne
6th Kampioenschap van Vlaanderen
2013
1st  Mountains classification Tour de Luxembourg
10th Coppa Ugo Agostoni
2014
1st  Mountains classification Tour de Suisse
2017
3rd Overall Tour of Qinghai Lake

References

External links

1988 births
Living people
German male cyclists
Sportspeople from Frankfurt
Doping cases in cycling